Cybaeus angustiarum is a spider species found in Europe to Azerbaijan.

See also 
 List of Cybaeidae species

References

External links 

Cybaeidae
Spiders of Asia
Fauna of Azerbaijan
Spiders described in 1868
Spiders of Europe